Splore is an annual boutique music and arts three day festival held at Tapapakanga Regional Park, in Orere Point, New Zealand with approximately 8,000 attendees.

The first Splore was held on New Year’s Eve 1998 and the festival ran consecutively for four years and then took a year off. In between 2004 and 2014 the festival was a bi-annual event until 2015 where it was it announced that the festival would continue annually.

References

Music festivals in New Zealand
Festivals in Auckland